Gertschanapis is a genus of North American araneomorph spiders in the family Anapidae, containing the single species, Gertschanapis shantzi. It was  first described by Norman I. Platnick & Raymond Robert Forster in 1990, and has only been found in United States.

References

Anapidae
Monotypic Araneomorphae genera
Spiders of the United States
Taxa named by Raymond Robert Forster